Hilișeu-Horia is a commune in Botoșani County, Western Moldavia, Romania. It is composed of five villages: Corjăuți, Hilișeu-Cloșca, Hilișeu-Crișan, Hilișeu-Horia and Iezer.

Natives
 Scarlat Vârnav

References

Communes in Botoșani County
Localities in Western Moldavia